Idahluy-e Bozorg (also Romanized as Īdahlūy-e Bozorg; also known as Īdahlū-ye Bozorg) is a village in Gavdul-e Sharqi Rural District, in the Central District of Malekan County, East Azerbaijan Province, Iran. At the 2006 census, its population was 458, in 131 families.

References 

Populated places in Malekan County